The Institute of Patentees and Inventors is a United Kingdom-based non-profit making association. It provides support to individuals on all aspects of inventing.

See also 
 Intellectual property organization

References

External links 
 

Innovation in the United Kingdom
Intellectual property organizations
Patentees and Inventors